Limb may refer to:

Science and technology
Limb (anatomy), an appendage of a human or animal
Limb, a large or main branch of a tree
Limb, in astronomy, the curved edge of the apparent disk of a celestial body, e.g. lunar limb
Limb, in botany, the border or upper spreading part of a petal or sepal
Limb, in a measuring instrument, the graduated edge of a circle or arc

Music
Limb (album), by Foetus, 2009
Limb, an album by Justin Clayton, 1999
"Limbs", a song by Emma Pollock from Watch the Fireworks, 2007
Limb Music, a German record label

Other uses
Limb (surname), a list of people
Limb McKenry (1888–1956), American baseball pitcher
Limb Brook, a stream in Sheffield, South Yorkshire, England
Limbs Dance Company, in Auckland, New Zealand
Limbs, in archery, the upper and lower working parts of the bow; see recurve bow
Bresso Airfield, Bresso, Italy (ICAO code)
Limbu script (ISO 15924 code)

See also
 Limb darkening, an optical effect seen in stars
 Limbe (disambiguation)